Edwin Harris "Ned" Colbert (September 28, 1905 – November 15, 2001) was a distinguished American vertebrate paleontologist and prolific researcher and author.

Born in Clarinda, Iowa, he grew up in Maryville, Missouri and graduated from Maryville High School.  His father was George H. Colbert who was head of the mathematics department at Northwest Missouri State University and had been at the college since its founding in 1906.

He received his A.B. from the University of Nebraska, then his Masters and Ph.D. from Columbia University, finishing in 1935.  He married Margaret Matthew, daughter of the eminent paleontologist William Diller Matthew, in 1933.  She became a noted artist, illustrator, and sculptor who specialized in visualizing extinct species.  The couple had five sons together.  The young family moved to Leonia, New Jersey, in 1937 and lived there for decades.

Among the positions Colbert held was Curator of Vertebrate Paleontology at the American Museum of Natural History for 40 years, and Professor Emeritus of Vertebrate Paleontology at Columbia University.  He was a protégé of Henry Fairfield Osborn, and a foremost authority on the Dinosauria.

For his work, Siwalik Mammals in the American Museum of Natural History, Colbert was awarded the Daniel Giraud Elliot Medal from the National Academy of Sciences in 1935. He described dozens of new taxa and authored major systematic reviews, including the discovery of more than a dozen complete skeletons of a primitive small Triassic dinosaur, Coelophysis at Ghost Ranch, New Mexico, in 1947 (one of the largest concentrations of dinosaur deposits ever recorded),  publication of their description, and a review of ceratopsian phylogeny.

In 1959, he headed an expedition to the Geopark of Paleorrota (Brazil), within Llewellyn Ivor Price.

His fieldwork in Antarctica in 1969 helped solidify the acceptance of continental drift, by finding a 220-million-year-old fossil of a Lystrosaurus.  His popularity and his textbooks on dinosaurs, paleontology, and stratigraphy (with Marshall Kay) introduced a new generation of scientists and amateur enthusiasts to the subject. He was the recipient of numerous prizes and awards commemorating his many achievements in the field of science.

He became a curator of vertebrate paleontology at the Museum of Northern Arizona in Flagstaff, Arizona in 1970.  He died at his home in Flagstaff in 2001.

Works
Colbert wrote more than 20 books and over 400 scientific articles.
1935: Siwalik Mammals in the American Museum of Natural History
1945: The Dinosaur Book: The Ruling Reptiles and Their Relatives (repub 1951)
1955: Colbert's Evolution of the Vertebrates: A History of the Backboned Animals Through Time (four more editions in 1969, 1980, 1991 & 2001; fifth edition with Eli C. Minkoff & Michael Morales)
1961: The World of Dinosaurs, illustrated by George Geygan (repub in 1977 as Dinosaur World)
1961: Dinosaurs: Their Discovery and Their World
1965: The Age of Reptiles, illustrated by Margaret Colbert (repub 1987)
1968: Men and Dinosaurs: The Search in Field and Laboratory (repub 1971)
1968: Millions of Years Ago: Prehistoric Life in North America, illustrated by Margaret Colbert
1973: Wandering Lands and Animals: The Story of Continental Drift and Animal Populations (repub 1985)
1977: The Year of the Dinosaur, illustrated by Margaret Colbert
1983: Dinosaurs: An Illustrated History. 
1984: The Great Dinosaur Hunters and Their Discoveries.  
1989: Digging into the Past: An Autobiography.  
1995: The Little Dinosaurs of Ghost Ranch.  
1980: Fossil-Hunter's Notebook: My Life with Dinosaurs and Other Friends, w/Elias Colbert.

References

 Ann Brimacombe Elliot, Charming the Bones: A Portrait of Margaret Matthew Colbert. Kent State University Press, 2000. .
 Romeu Beltrão, Cronologia Histórica de Santa Maria e do extinto município de São Martinho. 1787–1933. Vol I. Pallotti, 1958. (Portuguese)

External links

 

1905 births
2001 deaths
University of Nebraska–Lincoln alumni
American paleontologists
Columbia University faculty
American Unitarians
Columbia University alumni
People associated with the American Museum of Natural History
People from Clarinda, Iowa
People from Maryville, Missouri
People from Leonia, New Jersey
People from Flagstaff, Arizona